Pont-Sainte-Maxence is a commune in the Oise department in northern France, in the region of Hauts-de-France. It is named after Saint Maxentia of Beauvais, whose relics were taken here. Pont-Sainte-Maxence station has rail connections to Saint-Quentin, Compiègne, Creil and Paris.

Population

Twin towns — sister cities
Pont-Sainte-Maxence is twinned with:
 Sambreville, Belgium (1970)
 Linguère, Senegal (1974)
 Sulzbach, Hesse, Germany (1982)
 Grignasco, Italy (1992)
 Felgueiras, Portugal (1993)

See also
 Communes of the Oise department

References

Communes of Oise